Erwin W. Lutzer (born October 3, 1941) is an evangelical Christian speaker, radio broadcaster, and author. He is the former senior pastor of The Moody Church in Chicago, Illinois (19802016).

Career 
Born in Saskatchewan, Canada, Lutzer became a born-again Christian at age 14. In 1962, he graduated from Winnipeg Bible Institute (now Providence University College and Theological Seminary) with a Bachelor's Degree in Biblical Education. He served as senior pastor of Edgewater Baptist Church, Chicago, from 1971 to 1977. During that time he completed an M.A. in Philosophy from Loyola University Chicago.  Previously he had earned the Master of Theology from Dallas Theological Seminary in 1967. He then entered the PhD program at Loyola to pursue a doctorate in Philosophy; however, he did not complete his dissertation.  In subsequent years, Lutzer has received two honorary doctorates, an LL.D. from Simon Greenleaf School of Law and a Doctor of Divinity from Western Conservative Baptist Seminary.

The Moody Church
In January 1980, Lutzer became the senior pastor of The Moody Church in Chicago's Lincoln Park neighborhood. The church and its ministries grew significantly under his leadership, leading to the construction of a new Christian Life Center to complement the existing 75-year-old building. On January 4, 2016, at a Sunday sermon, Lutzer announced that he would be retiring from his senior pastor position at The Moody Church. He said he would retain the position until a new senior pastor was chosen, and afterward would consider himself to be the church's "Pastor Emeritus", hoping to "assume a wider role" by continuing his radio show "Running to Win" as well as "speaking at media rallies, conducting seminars, and writing books" in the future. On the Sunday morning of May 22, 2016, Lutzer preached his last sermon as senior pastor of The Moody Church and officially stepped down from the position.

False Light Invasion of Privacy In December 2010, The Illinois Appellate Court for the Second District upheld a jury verdict finding Lutzer liable in the amount of $276,306 for the above civil case brought against Lutzer by a former colleague and associate pastor. Additional citation

Radio and television
Lutzer is the speaker on three radio broadcasts: "Songs in the Night," "Running to Win", and "The Moody Church Hour." These broadcasts are heard on radio stations across the U.S., including Moody Radio and the Bible Broadcasting Network, and streamed worldwide on the internet. Lutzer speaks internationally at churches, conferences, and retreats, such as the Word of Life Conference Center in Hudson, Florida.

On November 10, 2018, his television production of A Call for Freedom, tracing the Protestant Reformation from the time of Martin Luther and shot on location in Germany, won three regional Emmy Awards.

Author
Lutzer has authored more than 50 books, including Hitler’s Cross, which won a Gold Medallion award from the Evangelical Christian Publishers Association, and the bestselling One Minute After You Die: A Preview of Your Final Destination.

Lutzer’s book critiquing Dan Brown’s best-selling novel The Da Vinci Code, entitled The Da Vinci Deception, was featured on national broadcasts in both secular and Christian markets.

Personal life
Lutzer and his wife, Rebecca, make their home in the Chicago area as of 2021. They have three adult children.

Works 
One Minute After You Die: A Preview of Your Final Destination, 
The Da Vinci Deception, 
Jesus, Lover of a Woman’s Soul (with Rebecca Lutzer), 
Christ Among Other Gods: A Defense of Christ in an Age of Tolerance, 
How to Say No to a Stubborn Habit, 
Hitler’s Cross: The Revealing Story of How the Cross of Christ Was Used as a Symbol of the Nazi Agenda (with Ravi Zacharias), 
The Doctrines That Divide: A Fresh Look at the Historic Doctrines That Separate Christians, 
Seven Reasons Why You Can Trust the Bible, 
The Vanishing Power Of Death: Conquering Your Greatest Fear, 
The Truth About Same-sex Marriage: 6 Things You Need To Know About What's Really At Stake, 
Where Was God? : Answers to Tough Questions About God And Natural Disasters, 
Is God on America's Side?: The Surprising Answer and Why it Matters During This Election Season, 
Oprah, Miracles, and the New Earth: A Critique, 
The Serpent of Paradise, 
Living With Your Passions, 
Failure : The Back Door to Success, 
Pastor to Pastor: Tackling the Problems of Ministry, 
Life-Changing Bible Verses You Should Know (with Rebecca Lutzer), 
The Cross in the Shadow of the Crescent: An Informed Response to Islam's War with Christianity (with Steve Miller), 
When a Nation Forgets God: 7 Lessons We Must Learn from Nazi Germany, 
The King is Coming: Preparing to Meet Jesus, 
When You've Been Wronged: Moving From Bitterness to Forgiveness, 
No Place to Cry: Hurt and Healing of Sexual Abuse (with Dorie N. Van Stone), 
How You Can Be Sure That You Will Spend Eternity with God, 
Your Eternal Reward: Triumph and Tears at the Judgment Seat of Christ, 
Making the Best of a Bad Decision: How to Put Your Regrets behind You, Embrace Grace, and Move toward a Better Future, 
Where Do We Go From Here?: Hope and Direction in our Present Crisis, 
Putting Your Past Behind You: Finding Hope for Life's Deepest Hurts, 
Who Are You to Judge?: Learning to Distinguish Between Truths, Half-Truths and Lies, 
Seven Snares of the Enemy: Breaking Free From the Devil's Grip, 
Getting Closer to God: Lessons from the Life of Moses, 
Cries from the Cross: A Journey Into the Heart of Jesus, 
On the Path with God, 
Covering Your Life in Prayer: Discover a Life-Changing Conversation with God, 
After You've Blown It: Reconnecting with God and Others, 
Managing Your Emotions, 
Conquering the Fear of Failure: Lessons from the Life of Joshua, 
10 Lies About God: And the Truths That Shatter Deception, 
Chiseled by the Master's Hand: Lessons from the Life of Peter, 
Why Good People Do Bad Things, 
When a good man falls, 
Growing Through Conflict: Lessons from the Life of David, 
Keep Your Dream Alive: Lessons from the Life of Joseph, 
Winning The Inner War, 
Twelve Myths Americans Believe, 
Why the Cross Can Do What Political Can't: When They See You, Do They See Jesus?, 
Slandering Jesus: Six Lies People Tell about the Man Who Said He Was God, 
All One Body Why Don't We Agree, 
Ten Lies About God: And How You Might Already Be Deceived, 
Overcoming the Grasshopper Complex, 
Measuring Morality: A Comparison of Ethical Systems, 
How in This World Can I Be Holy? (with Charles C. Ryrie), 
Satan's Evangelistic Strategy for This New Age (with John F. Devries), 
The Necessity of Ethical Absolutes, 
You're Richer Than You Think, 
How to Have a Whole Heart in a Broken World, 
Matters of Life and Death: 10 Questions No Serious Christian Can Avoid, 
Why Are We the Enemy?, 
The Morality Gap : an evangelical response to situation ethics, 
Will America Be Given Another Chance? a Message of Challenge and Hope for Today's Spiritual Crisis, 
The Church in Babylon: Heeding the Call to Be a Light in the Darkness,

References

External links 
Running to Win with Dr. Erwin Lutzer broadcast and video archives
Running to Win with Dr. Erwin Lutzer audio archives
Erwin Lutzer’s homepage

Living people
1941 births
Baptist writers
Promise Keepers
Radio personalities from Chicago
20th-century Canadian Baptist ministers
21st-century Canadian Baptist ministers
Writers from Regina, Saskatchewan